Davide Sanguinetti  (born 25 August 1972) is an Italian former professional male tennis player.

Personal life
Born in Viareggio in Tuscany, he attended the Harry Hopman academy in Florida and then UCLA. He now resides in Monte Carlo.

Tennis career
Sanguinetti has won two ATP singles titles in 2002, defeating Roger Federer (Milan Indoor) and Andy Roddick (Delray Beach) in the finals, and one doubles titles (Umag 1997). His career-high singles ranking was World No. 42 (31 December 2005), and he has represented Italy in the Davis Cup since 1998.

In 1998, Sanguinetti made a run to the Wimbledon quarter-finals, defeating Johan Van Herck, Franco Squillari, Vladimir Voltchkov and Francisco Clavet before losing to Richard Krajicek in straight sets. At the 2005 US Open, Sanguinetti achieved one of the most memorable runs of his career, reaching the fourth round. He defeated Carlos Moyà and Paradorn Srichaphan - the latter in a four-and-a-half-hour match - before losing to David Nalbandian. However, he gained a bit of redemption when he upset Nalbandian in the first round of the Rogers Cup in Toronto on 7 August 2006.

Sanguinetti has a .500 record in Davis Cup matches, last playing against Zimbabwe in 2003, defeating Nigel Badza and losing to Wayne Black.

Coaching career
He was the coach of Vince Spadea 2008-11, and is the new coach of Go Soeda and Dinara Safina.

ATP career finals

Singles: 6 (2 titles, 4 runner-ups)

Doubles: 2 (1 title, 1 runner-up)

ATP Challenger and ITF Futures finals

Singles: 16 (10–6)

Doubles: 7 (5–2)

Performance timelines

Singles

Doubles

References

External links 
 
 
 
 Sanguinetti's World Ranking history

1972 births
Living people
Hopman Cup competitors
People from Viareggio
Italian expatriates in Monaco
Italian male tennis players
Italian tennis coaches
UCLA Bruins men's tennis players
Sportspeople from the Province of Lucca